Vordereifel is a Verbandsgemeinde ("collective municipality") in the district of Mayen-Koblenz, in Rhineland-Palatinate, Germany. It is situated on the eastern edge of the Eifel, west of Mayen. The seat of the municipality is in Mayen, itself not part of the municipality.

The Verbandsgemeinde Vordereifel consists of the following Ortsgemeinden ("local municipalities"):

References

Verbandsgemeinde in Rhineland-Palatinate